Manju Pillai (born 11 May 1976) is an Indian actress who appears in Malayalam films and television shows. She is best known for portraying comedic roles, but has also played character roles. She has won the Kerala State Television Award for Kerala State Television Award for Best Supporting Actress in two consecutive years (2001 and 2002). In 2007, she played one of the female lead roles in Adoor Gopalakrishnan's drama film Naalu Pennungal. Manju is the granddaughter of Malayalam film actor S. P. Pillai.Manju received huge acclaim for her performance in the 2021 film Home.

Personal life

Manju Pillai is the granddaughter of Malayalam film actor S. P. Pillai. She did her undergraduate studies from Mar Ivanios College, Trivandrum. She was married to Malayalam cine-serial artist Mukundan Menon & was later divorced. She married cinematographer Sujith Vaassudev on 23 December 2000. They have a daughter Daya Sujith.

Career

Manju first acted in the television serial Sathyavum Mithyayum. In 2000 and 2001, Manju won the Kerala State Television Award for Best Supporting Actress for V. N. Mohandas's serial Devaranjini and Venu Nair's Sethuvinte Kathakal. She won the Film Critics' Award the same year. In 2002–2003, she again won the State Award for the best television actress for Ali Akbar's Sundaranmarum Sundarikalum.

Filmography

Films

Other Works

Television

Serials

Television shows

Advertisements 
 Mazhavil Manorama
 Mazhavil FM
 Samson & Samson Lifestyle
 Maa Washing Powder
 Mahilaratnam Magazine
 Asian Paints Ultima Protek

Other Works 

Chithrageetham
Amma Mazhavillu
Day with a star
Annie's Kitchen
Funny Nights with Pearle Maaney
Katha Ethuvare
Manasilloru Mazhavillu
Light & Sound Drama - Sthreeparvam
Manorama Newsmaker
Vanitha Magazine
Shubharathri
Idavelayil
Little World
Amma Shows
Take It Easy
 Morning Guest
Ividinganannu Bhai
Hello Namasthe
 Namasthe Keralam
Malayali Durbar
JB Junction
Cinema Chirima
Bellari Manjuvum Bumper Onavum
My Favourites
Comedy Super Nite
Orikkal Koodi
1.1.3
Radio Mango
Fast Track
Badayi Bunglawu
Malayala Manorama
Lalitham 50
Nakshathrathilakkam
Manjubhashitham
Utsavam Superstar
 Chat Show
Star Chat
Morning Guest
Tamasha Bazar
Morning Reporter
Talk Time
Mazhavil Azhakil Amma
ABC -Artists Big Chat
Satvika
Snehathalam
Cinema One
Manju Pillakkoppam Chila Kudumbachithrangal
Breakfast News
Hello My Dear Wrong Number (Radio)
Spotlight
Tharapakittu

Awards

Kerala State Television Awards
2001: Best Supporting Actress
2002: Best Supporting Actress

Kerala Film Critics Association Awards
2022: Best second actress 

Flowers TV Awards
2017: Best Comedian

Good Knight Film and Business Awards 2017

Janmabhoomi Television Awards - Best female comedian

 FRAME Journalism Awards
2009 - Best Comedian

 Reporter TV Awards

2021 Best Supporting  actress - Home

References

External links 
 
 Manju Pillai at MSI

Actresses from Thiruvananthapuram
Actresses in Malayalam cinema
Living people
Indian film actresses
1976 births
Actresses in Tamil cinema
Actresses in Malayalam television
Indian television actresses
20th-century Indian actresses
21st-century Indian actresses